The Jefferson Street station is a station on the BMT Canarsie Line of the New York City Subway. Located in Bushwick, Brooklyn at the intersection of Jefferson Street and Wyckoff Avenue, it is served by the L train at all times.

History

Background

In 1913, the Dual Contracts were signed, which called for the construction of various rapid transit services throughout the City of New York. Among these was a subway line initially known as the 14th Street–Eastern District Line, usually shortened to 14th Street–Eastern Line. The line would run beneath 14th Street in Manhattan, from Sixth Avenue under the East River and through Williamsburg to Montrose and Bushwick Avenues in Brooklyn. Booth and Flinn was awarded the contract to construct the line on January 13, 1916. Clifford Milburn Holland served as the engineer-in-charge during the construction.

Due to the city's failure to approve the section of the line between Montrose Avenue and East New York, the 14th Street/Eastern Line was initially isolated from the rest of the system. In 1924, a temporary connection was built from the Long Island Rail Road (LIRR)'s Bushwick Yard that ran via Montrose Avenue and then connected to the 14th Street/Eastern Line under Bushwick Avenue just near the Montrose Avenue station. This was done to allow the delivery of BMT Standard subway cars. The first of the cars were delivered by this ramp on June 20, 1924. On June 30, 1924, the section between Sixth Avenue in Manhattan and Montrose Avenue in Brooklyn opened.

Construction and opening
For the extension of the 14th Street/Eastern Line from Montrose Avenue to East New York, the New York City Board of Estimate had initially given its consent to an elevated line over the Evergreen Branch of the LIRR. The Board of Estimate subsequently refused to allow a construction contract for the elevated line, while the BRT did not want to build an underground line. The extension was changed to an underground alignment following opposition from industries on the Evergreen Branch. In July 1924, the New York City Board of Transportation (BOT) approved a modified route for recommendation to the Board of Estimate. The route would be wholly underground and consist of three tracks. From Montrose Avenue, it would curve east under McKibbin Street, private property, and Harrison Place. Past Varick Avenue, it would turn southeast to Wyckoff Avenue, underneath which it would run to Eldert Street. This plan was to cost $8 million. 

In September 1924, the BOT approved the remaining section of the route between Eldert Street and Broadway Junction in East New York. East of Eldert Street, the route would turn south to a ground-level alignment parallel to the LIRR's Bay Ridge Branch, then run southeast in a tunnel underneath private property to the intersection of Eastern Parkway and Bushwick Avenue, where it would emerge onto a ramp leading to the existing Canarsie elevated. An ornamental viaduct over Bushwick Avenue and Eastern Parkway was removed from the original plans due to opposition from property owners who called it a "Chinese wall". 

Three contracts for the construction of the extension were awarded in December at a total cost of $9,531,204. The section from Montrose Avenue to Varick Avenue was awarded to the Underpinning and Foundation Company, while the section from Varick Avenue to Bleecker Street and from Bleecker Street to Halsey Street went to the Oakdale Contracting Company.

On July 14, 1928, the line was extended further east beneath Wyckoff Avenue and then south paralleling the Bay Ridge Branch to a new station at Broadway Junction, above the existing station on the Broadway Elevated (Jamaica Line). At this time, it was connected to the already-operating elevated line to Canarsie. The Jefferson Street station opened as part of this extension.

Station renovation
In 2019, the Metropolitan Transportation Authority announced that this station would become ADA-accessible as part of the agency's 2020–2024 Capital Program.

Station layout

This underground station has two side platforms and two tracks.

The mosaic tile bands on both platforms are predominantly blue and brown with yellow and tan accents. There is a full frieze of icons with correct details. The colors, however, shift from the earth tones found in the original design to more pastel shades of rose, slate blue, yellow and peach. Some of the background tile is mottled. This is handmade work with all of the proper elements, including randomly cut and set tiles in the center. "J" tablets on a blue background run along the trim line at regular intervals.

The station's name tablets read "JEFFERSON ST." in gold serif lettering on a blue/dark red background, yellow inner border, and green outer border. There are also directional signs in gold serif lettering on blue/dark red background and yellow/green border. Blue i-beam columns run along both platforms at regular intervals with alternating ones having the standard black station name plate in white lettering. New tile was installed at the Canarsie-bound platform in the summer of 2000.

Exits
This station's full-time fare control area is at the extreme east (railroad south) end. A double-width staircase from each platform goes up to a waiting area/crossover, where a turnstile provides entrance/exit from the station. Outside fare control, there is a token booth and four staircases going up to all corners of Starr Street and Wyckoff Avenue.

Both platforms have a same-level, unstaffed fare control area at the opposite end. One exit-only turnstile and one High Entry/Exit Turnstile lead to an enclosed staircase going up to a small brick building on either western corners of Jefferson Street and Wyckoff Avenue. The Manhattan-bound building is on the northwest corner while the Canarsie-bound building is on the southwest one.

References

External links 

 Station Reporter — 
 The Subway Nut — Jefferson Street Pictures
 Jefferson Street entrance from Google Maps Street View
 Starr Street entrance from Google Maps Street View
 Platforms from Google Maps Street View

BMT Canarsie Line stations
New York City Subway stations in Brooklyn
Railway stations in the United States opened in 1928
1928 establishments in New York City
Bushwick, Brooklyn